Annelies Nuy (born 15 December 1960) is a Dutch fashion designer, founder of the lingerie line Der Kommissar.

Nuy was born in Doornenburg, studied fashion and "new media" at the Academy for Applied Arts in Arnhem, and in 1997 launched one of the first fashion websites. In 1998 she launched FashionFastForward, the first Dutch fashion platform with a sales module; this was in operation until May 2002, when she took a position with the Beroepsorganisatie Nederlandse Ontwerpers (the association of Dutch designers and illustrators).
In 2006 Nuy launched Der Kommissar, a lingerie label which included fetish themes. Nuy said in 2006, when her first collection was shown, that the clothes were primarily intended not for functionality, but to enable the client to "play with her alter ego", and titled her summer 2009 collection "High Fetish Alterego Lingerie". The brand's philosophy has been put in terms of "four P's": "Please, Play, Passion and Power". Between 2006 and 2009, she presented her collections during the Amsterdam Fashion week, at Mode Marché Rotterdam and at the Arnhem Fashion Biennale. In addition she presented internationally at the first Glasgow Fashion Week, at the Interfiliere Evolution Days in Paris and at the first Boudoir Show in Berlin, for which Nuy designed lingerie for Barbie.

References

External links
 Der Kommissar

1960 births
Living people
Dutch fashion designers
Dutch women fashion designers
People from Lingewaard